Speyeria callippe, the callippe fritillary, is a North American species of butterflies in the brush-footed family Nymphalidae.

Subspecies
Listed alphabetically:

S. c. calgariana (McDunnough, 1924)
S. c. callippe Boisduval, 1852
S. c. comstocki (Gunder, 1925) – Comstock's silverspot
S. c. elaine dos Passos & Grey, 1945
S. c. gallatini (McDunnough, 1929)
S. c. harmonia dos Passos & Grey, 1945
S. c. juba (Boisduval, 1869)
S. c. laura (Edwards, 1879)
S. c. laurina (Wright, 1905)
S. c. liliana (H. Edwards, 1877)
S. c. nevadensis (Edwards, 1870)
S. c. macaria (Edwards, 1877)
S. c. meadii (Edwards, 1872)
S. c. rupestris (Behr, 1863)
S. c. semivirida (McDunnough, 1924)
S. c. sierra dos Passos & Grey, 1945

Distribution and habitat
This species can be found in North America, from Central British Columbia east to South Dakota and Manitoba, south to southern California, Nevada, Utah, and Colorado. These butterflies usually inhabit sagebrush, dry woodland, edge of forests, chaparral and grassy hillsides.

Description
In these large and widespread butterflies the color of the upperside of the wings varies from tawny to bright red-brown with black evenly-spaced zigzag stripes. The entire outer contour is black-brown, divided by a row of pale lunules. The underside of the forewings is  red fawn, with the same design as above, and a series of marginal silver lunules. The underside of the hindwings is brown, with  about twenty-two large silvered spots and triangular silver submarginal spots with narrow brown edges. In the last stage the larvae are greyish, with black and grey patches and black-orange spines.

Biology
Speyeria callippe is a univoltine species. Adults fly from May to August, usually patrolling for females, which emerge before males. Eggs are laid in litter near the host plants. Unfed first-stage caterpillars overwinter until spring, when they feed on leaves of Viola pedunculata, Viola nuttallii, Viola beckwithii, Viola douglasii and Viola purpurea.

Gallery

References

External links
 Wild Utah
 Moth Photographers Group
 Butterflies of America

Speyeria
Butterflies of North America
Butterflies described in 1852
Taxa named by Jean Baptiste Boisduval
Articles containing video clips